The  is a series of compact cars (formerly subcompact) manufactured and marketed globally by the Japanese automaker Toyota Motor Corporation. Introduced in 1966, the Corolla was the best-selling car worldwide by 1974 and has been one of the best-selling cars in the world since then. In 1997, the Corolla became the best-selling nameplate in the world, surpassing the Volkswagen Beetle. Toyota reached the milestone of 50 million Corollas sold over twelve generations in 2021. 

The name Corolla is part of Toyota's naming tradition of using names derived from the Toyota Crown for sedans, with "corolla" Latin for "small crown". The Corolla has always been exclusive in Japan to Toyota Corolla Store locations, and manufactured in Japan with a twin, called the Toyota Sprinter until 2000. From 2006 to 2018 in Japan and much of the world, and from 2018 to 2020 in Taiwan, the hatchback companion had been called the Toyota Auris.

Early models were mostly rear-wheel drive, while later models have been front-wheel drive. Four-wheel drive versions have also been produced, and it has undergone several major redesigns. The Corolla's traditional competitors have been the Nissan Sunny, introduced the same year as the Corolla in Japan and the later Nissan Sentra, Nissan Sylphy, Honda Civic and Mitsubishi Lancer. The Corolla's chassis designation code is "E", as described in Toyota's chassis and engine codes.



Production locations 

Corollas are manufactured in Japan at the original Takaoka plant built in 1966. Various production facilities have been built in Brazil, (Indaiatuba, São Paulo), Canada (Cambridge, Ontario), China (Tianjin), Pakistan (Karachi), South Africa (Durban), Taiwan, Thailand, Vietnam, Turkey, and United Kingdom (Derbyshire). Production or assembly has previously been carried out in Australia (Victoria), India (Bangalore), Indonesia (Jakarta), Malaysia, New Zealand (Thames), the Philippines (Santa Rosa, Laguna), and Venezuela.

Production in the United States (at NUMMI in Fremont, California) ended in March 2010. Production resumed the following year after the Toyota Motor Manufacturing Mississippi plant was opened in November 2011 in Blue Springs, Mississippi.

First generation (E10; 1966) 

The first generation Corolla was introduced in November 1966 with the new 1100 cc K pushrod engine. The Corolla Sprinter was introduced as the fastback version in 1968, and exclusive to a Toyota Japan dealership retail outlet called Toyota Auto Store.

Second generation (E20; 1970) 

In May 1970, the E20 was restyled with a more rounded body. The now mutually exclusive Corolla and Sprinter names were used to differentiate between two slightly different treatments of sheet metal and trim. The Corolla Levin and Sprinter Trueno names were introduced as the enhanced performance version of the Corolla and Sprinter respectively when a double overhead camshaft version of the 2T engine was introduced in March 1972 (TE27).

In September 1970, the 1400 cc T and 1600 cc 2T OHV engines were added to the range.

In Australia, only the 1.2 L engine (3K) powered 2-door KE20 was available as a sedan and wagon / panelvan. The brakes were single system with no booster, solid discs on the front and rear drums. Front sway bar but no rear sway bar. Parts are not compatible with later models.

In New Zealand, the 4-door KE20 was available.

Most models stopped production in July 1974 but the KE26 wagon and van were still marketed in Japan alongside the new 30-series, until production finally ended in May 1978.

Third generation (E30, E40, E50, E60; 1974) 

April 1974 brought rounder, bigger and heavier Corollas and Sprinters. The range was rounded out with the addition of a two-door liftback. The Corollas were given E30 codes while the Sprinters were given E40 codes. A facelift in March 1976 saw most Corolla E30 models replaced by equivalent E50 models and most Sprinter E40 models were replaced by equivalent E60 models. The E30 Corolla was fitted with retracting front seat belts.

In Australia, KE3x was available as 4-door sedan, 2-door sedan, 2-door panel van (KE36) and 4-door wagon (KE38). All had 3K engines and K40 4-speed manual or 3-speed automatic gearbox. Sprinters were not available. Later KE5x models were available as 4-door sedan or 2-door coupe (a true pillarless design) with 4K engine. The KE55 was 50 kg heavier due to the addition of side impact protection in the doors, but due to a change in the body metal and seam sealing they are prone to rust. Later KE55 also used plastic ended bumper bars as opposed to the all chrome bumpers of the previous models, but included a rear sway bar for the first time.

Fourth generation (E70; 1979) 

A major restyle in March 1979 brought a square edged design. The Corollas had a simpler treatment of the grill, headlights and tail lights while the Sprinter used a slightly more complex, sculptured treatment. The new A series engines were added to the range as a running change. This was the last model to use the K "hicam" and T series engines. Fuel injection was introduced as an extra cost option on Japanese market vehicles.

The wagon and van continued to be made until June 1987 after the rest of the range was replaced by the E80 generation.

Fifth generation (E80; 1983) 

A sloping front bonnet and a contemporary sharp-edged, no-frills style was brought in during May 1983. The new 1839 cc 1C diesel engine was added to the range with the E80 Series. From 1985, re-badged E80 Sprinters were sold in the U.S. as the fifth-generation Chevrolet Nova. Fuel injection was introduced as an extra cost option internationally.

Most models now used the front-wheel drive layout except the AE85 and AE86, which were to be the last Corollas offered in the rear-wheel drive or FR layout. The AE85 and AE86 chassis codes were also used for the Sprinter (including the Sprinter Trueno). The Sprinter was nearly identical to the Corolla, differing only by minor body styling changes such as pop-up headlights.

This generation was made until 1990 in Venezuela.

Sixth generation (E90; 1987) 

A somewhat more rounded and aerodynamic style was used for the E90 introduced in May 1987. Overall this generation has a more refined feel than older Corollas and other older subcompacts. Most models were now front-wheel drive, along with a few AWD All-Trac models. Many engines were used on a wide array of trim levels and models, ranging from the 1.3-liter 2E to the  supercharged 4A-GZE. In the US, the E90 Sprinter was built and sold as both the Toyota Sprinter and the Geo Prizm. In Australia, the E90 Corolla was built and sold as both the Toyota Corolla and the Holden Nova.

In South Africa, this generation continued to be built until August 2006.

Seventh generation (E100; 1991) 

In June 1991, Corollas received a redesign to be larger, heavier, and have the completely rounded, aerodynamic shape of the 1990s. In the United States, the somewhat larger Corolla was now in the compact class, rather than subcompact, and the coupé was still available in some markets, known as the AE101 Corolla Levin. Carburetors were mostly retired with this generation.

Eighth generation (E110; 1995) 

Production of the E110 Corolla started in May 1995. The design of the car was slightly altered throughout but retained a look similar to that of the E100. In 1998, for the first time, some non-Japanese Corollas received the new 1ZZ-FE engine. The 1ZZ-FE engine had an aluminum engine block and aluminum cylinder heads, which made models powered by this motor lighter than versions powered by A series engines which had cast iron blocks with aluminium heads. The model range began to change as Toyota decided styling differences would improve sales in different markets.

This generation was delayed in North America until mid-1997 (US 1998 model year), where it had unique front and rear styling. Europe and Australasia received versions of their own as well. In Pakistan, this model was halted in November 1998, while production was closed in March 2002.

Ninth generation (E120, E130; 2000) 
In August 2000, the E120 ninth-generation Corolla was introduced in Japan, with edgier styling and more technology to bring the nameplate into the 21st century. This version was sold in Japan, Australasia, Europe and the Middle East.

In mid-2001, the E120 Corolla Altis was released. It had a refreshed look and was slightly longer and wider than the E120 for other markets, but with similar body panels and interior. The Altis was sold in Southeast Asia, India, and Taiwan. India received a de-tuned version of the 1ZZ-FE and was comparatively slower than its rivals.

The North American release was delayed until March 2002 (for the 2003 model year). The E130 was sold in North America from 2003 to 2008. It had similar look to the Corolla Altis sold in Southeast Asia. The E120 continued in parallel in separate markets to the E130.

The station wagon model is called the Corolla Fielder in Japan. Production in Japan ended in January 2007 (for Corolla Runx and Allex), but production in North America continued until October 2007.

Production continued in China as the Corolla EX until February 2017.

Tenth generation (E140, E150; 2006)

Japan (E140 narrow) 

The tenth generation of the E140 Corolla was introduced in October 2006. Japanese markets called the sedan Corolla Axio. The station wagon retained the Corolla Fielder name.

International (E140/E150 wide) 

For international markets, a wider version of the E140 was sold with different styling, with the Southeast Asian, Pakistani, Indian and Taiwanese markets retaining the Corolla Altis branding. Production continued from June 2014 until 2020 in South Africa as the entry-level Corolla Quest.

In Australasia, the related first-generation Toyota Auris was also sold as the Corolla hatchback alongside the sedan body shape of the International E140 Corolla.

Eleventh generation (E160, E170, E180; 2012)

Japan (E160; 2012) 

The eleventh generation of the Corolla went on sale in Japan in May 2012. The sedan is named the Corolla Axio while the wagon is called the Corolla Fielder. In Japan, both are made by a Toyota subsidiary, Central Motors, in Miyagi Prefecture, Japan. The redesigned model has slightly smaller exterior dimensions and is easier to drive in narrow alleys and parking lots for the targeted elderly drivers.

The new Corolla Axio is available with either a 1.3-liter 1NR-FE or 1.5-liter 1NZ-FE four-cylinder engines; front- or all-wheel drive. Both 5-speed manual and CVT transmissions are offered. The 1.3-liter engine and all-wheel-drive variants are available only with the CVT transmission. The Corolla Fielder is available with 1.5-liter 1NZ-FE or 1.8-liter 2ZR-FAE four cylinder engines mated with a CVT transmission. The 1.5-liter is available with front- and all-wheel drive, the 1.8-liter is offered only in front-wheel drive.
Since 2015 there's a new engine 2NR-FKE, with its VVT-ie technology.

Toyota released hybrid versions of the Corolla Axio sedan and Corolla Fielder station wagon for the Japanese market in August 2013. Both cars are equipped with a 1.5-liter hybrid system similar to the one used in the Toyota Prius C, with a fuel efficiency of  under the JC08 test cycle. Toyota's monthly sales target for Japan is 1,000 units of the Corolla Axio hybrid and 1,500 units of the Corolla Fielder hybrid.

The E160 was also sold in Hong Kong, Macau, and New Zealand.

International (E170/E180; 2013) 

International markets continued on with the E140/E150 until at least 2013 when the E170/E180 model arrived. The E170/E180 is larger and substantially different from the Japanese E160, with a unique body and interior. Two basic front and rear styling treatments are fitted to the E170: a North American version that debuted first and a more conservative design for other markets that debuted later in 2013. The latter version sold in Southeast Asian, Pakistani, Indian and Taiwanese markets retained the Corolla Altis branding. The Corolla E180 went on sale in Europe and South Africa in February 2014.

In Australasia, the European market second-generation Toyota Auris was also sold badged as the Corolla hatchback, alongside the international E170 Corolla. 

In 2017, Toyota released a hatchback version in the US called the Corolla iM, a rebadged second-generation facelifted Auris.

Twelfth generation (E210; 2018) 

The twelfth generation of the Corolla is available in three body styles:

Hatchback 

The twelfth generation Corolla in hatchback body style was unveiled as a pre-production model in early March 2018 at the Geneva Motor Show as the Auris. The production version of the Corolla Hatchback for the North American market was unveiled on 28 March 2018 at the New York International Auto Show, with the official details and photos revealed on 22 March 2018. The Corolla Hatchback was launched in Japan on 27 June 2018 as the Corolla Sport. The Corolla Hatchback went on sale in the United States in mid-July 2018, and was later launched in Australia on 7 August 2018. Production of the European market Corolla Hatchback began on 14 January 2019, and sales began in the UK in February 2019 and across Europe in March 2019.

A high-performance variant of the Corolla hatchback, called the GR Corolla, debuted in March 2022.

Estate 

The estate variation of the twelfth generation Corolla, called the Corolla Touring Sports (simply called Corolla Touring in Japan), was unveiled at the 2018 Paris Motor Show. The official images of the Corolla Touring Sports were revealed on 4 September 2018.

The Corolla Touring Sports is also sold by Suzuki as the Swace in Europe.

Sedan 

The sedan variation of the Corolla was unveiled simultaneously between 15 and 16 November 2018 in Carmel-by-the-Sea, California, United States, and in China at the 2018 Guangzhou International Motor Show. The model is sold in two versions: Prestige (sold in China, Europe and other countries) and Sporty (sold in North America, Japan, Australia and other countries), and sold in China as the Levin. The Prestige model uses a different front fascia, which is more similar to the XV70 Camry. This model is sold as the Corolla Altis in Taiwan and Southeast Asia. The Sporty model uses a similar front fascia to the hatchback and wagon versions. A long-wheelbase version of the Prestige model with a slightly altered front fascia is sold as the Allion in China, while the long-wheelbase Sporty version is called the Levin GT.

Sales

Alternative versions 

In Japan, the Corolla has always been exclusive to the Japanese retail sales chain called Toyota Corolla Store, which was previously established in 1961, known as Toyota Publica Store, selling the Publica. A badge engineered version called the Sprinter was introduced around the same time as the Corolla in Japan, and sold through a different Toyota Japan dealership sales channel known since 1966 as Toyota Auto Store.

There have been several models over the years, including the Corolla Ceres (and similar Sprinter Marino) hardtop, Corolla Levin and Sprinter Trueno sports coupés and hatchbacks, and the Corolla FX hatchback, which became the Corolla RunX, while the Sprinter became the Allex, with the introduction of the E120 series Corolla. The RunX and Allex was replaced by the Auris in 2006 (known only as Corolla in markets outside Japan, Europe and South Africa). A luxury version of the Auris installed with V6 engines was briefly sold at Japanese Toyota dealerships Toyota Store and Toyopet Store locations as the Blade, which was sold until 2012.

A compact MPV named the Corolla Verso has also been released in European markets. Its Japanese counterpart is the Corolla Spacio, which has been discontinued as of the tenth generation. The Corolla Rumion is also sold in the US market as the Scion xB.

The Corolla Matrix, better known just as the Matrix, shares the E120 and E140 platforms, and is considered the hatchback/sport wagon counterpart of the North American Corolla sedan, as the European/Australasian Corolla hatchback is not sold there. Toyota frequently combines the sales figures of the Corolla sedan and Matrix. The Pontiac Vibe, which is the General Motors badged version of the Matrix, shares the Corolla platform. The Vibe was exported from Fremont, California, to the Japanese market where it was sold as the Toyota Voltz.

The Corolla Cross is the crossover SUV-counterpart of the E210 series Corolla.

Over many years, there have been rebadged versions of the Corolla, sold by General Motors, including the Holden Nova in Australia during the early 1990s, and the Sprinter-based Chevrolet Nova, Chevrolet Prizm, and Geo Prizm (in the United States as part of the GM S platform). The Corolla liftback (TE72) of Toyota Australia was badged as simply the T-18. The five-door liftback was sold with the Corolla Seca name in Australia and the nameplate survived on successive five-door models.

The Daihatsu Charmant was produced from the E30 to the E70 series.

The Tercel was a front wheel drive car, first introduced in 1980 at Japanese Toyota dealerships called Toyota Corolla Store, and was called the Corolla Tercel then, and later given its own name in 1984. The Tercel platform was also used for the Corolla II hatchback in Japan.

See also 

 Toyota Sprinter, the Corolla's twin for Japanese market with slightly different body panels
 Toyota Corolla Levin and Sprinter Trueno, a sports-oriented model of the Corolla and Sprinter
 Toyota AE86
 Toyota Corolla Ceres and Sprinter Marino, a hardtop variation of the E100 Corolla/Sprinter sedan
 Toyota GR Corolla, a high-performance variant of the E210 Corolla hatchback
 Toyota Corolla Rumion, a tall hatchback variation of the E150 series Corolla
 Toyota Matrix (Corolla Matrix), a hatchback/wagon based on the Corolla for the North American market
 Toyota Corolla Spacio, a mini MPV with the Corolla nameplate for the Japanese market
 Toyota Corolla Verso, a mini MPV with the Corolla nameplate for the European market
 Toyota Corolla Cross, a crossover SUV counterpart of the E210 series Corolla
 Toyota Corolla WRC, a World Rally Car based on the E110 Corolla hatchback
 Chevrolet Nova, a Chevrolet-rebadged Sprinter (North America, 1984–1988)
 Holden Nova, a Holden-rebadged Corolla (Australia, 1989–1996)
 Geo Prizm, a Geo-rebadged Sprinter (North America, 1989–1997)
 Chevrolet Prizm, a Chevrolet-rebadged Corolla (North America, 1997–2002)

References

External links 

 
 Toyota Global Site  Vehicle Heritage · Corolla
 blog.toyota.co.uk : Vehicles : Corolla History (official site)

 
Corolla
Cars introduced in 1966
1970s cars
1980s cars
1990s cars
2000s cars
2010s cars
2020s cars
Rear-wheel-drive vehicles
Front-wheel-drive vehicles
All-wheel-drive vehicles
Subcompact cars
Compact cars
Sedans
Hatchbacks
Station wagons
Coupés